A néôrion (in Ancient Greek,  tò néôrion) is a type of classical Greek commemorative monument designed to celebrate a naval victory.  It is a long gallery in which a ship is displayed (hence the name), occasionally one of the enemy, in honour of the battle.

Neorion in Greek is also a term describing a port facility where ship construction and repair takes place (like the famous Neorion areas in Herakleion, Crete, built by the Venetians).

Examples
 At the Sanctuary of the Great Gods at Samothrace.
 At the sanctuary of Apollo at Delos, a neorion contained the flagship of Antigonus II Gonatas which he offered to celebrate the victory at Kos against the Ptolemaics in 255 BC. This Neorion is believed to have been built on the site of a previous one.

References

 René Ginouvès. Dictionnaire méthodique de l'architecture grecque et romaine, tome III, Espace architecturaux, bâtiments et ensembles  Collection de l'École française de Rome 84, EFR - EFA, 1998  , p. 68.
Translated from the French wiki article :fr:Néôrion 10 May 2006

Ancient Greek buildings and structures
Antigonid Macedonia
Ancient Delos
Ancient Greek military art